Eino Markus Rautio (17 May 1891 – 14 February 1973), also known as Uncle Markus, was a Finnish radio journalist and presenter.

Between 1926 and 1956 he presented the children's radio show Children's Hour with Uncle Markus on the National Radio of Finland.

On his show he said Father Christmas lived in Lapland on Ear Mountain (Korvatunturi), on the basis that this was where he could hear everything to find out who was naughty and nice. The theme was later taken up by Mauri Kunnas in his books on Christmas, wherein Santa Claus lives in a remote village on the side of the Hill, with his elves and reindeer.

Rautio was buried in Hietaniemi Cemetery.

References

External links

1891 births
1973 deaths
Mass media people from Helsinki
People from Uusimaa Province (Grand Duchy of Finland)
Finnish radio presenters
20th-century Finnish journalists